The Historical Logging Switchback Railway in Vychylovka (near Nová Bystrica, Slovakia) is preserved section technically most interesting part of the former narrow-gauge zig zag logging railway located in Kysuce and Orava region. The railway was closed in 1971 and disassembled, except an 8 km section from Chmúra to Tanečník. Currently a  section is used as a heritage railway for tourists.

Vehicles
Steam locomotive MÁV 2282/1909 (U34.901) – in service
Steam locomotive MÁV 4281/1916 (U45.9) – in service until 1999
Steam locomotive Kraus Maffei 15791/1940 – out of service
Steam locomotive ČKD 2612/1948 – out of service
Steam locomotive ČKD 1441/1928 – in service (this is the last locomotive that went along the disassembled track in 1972; Until 1990 placed as memorial in depot Žilina). Enthusiasts from the civic association Krúžok long fought for her rescue. A generous sponsorship donation to save the locomotive and its two-year repair allowed the historic machine in 2011 to return to the Oravan valleys and consider tourists.

See also 
 Čierny Hron Railway
List of transport museums in Slovakia
List of museums in Slovakia

External links 

The club of romantics of the narrow-gauge railway of Orava and Kysuce

Railway lines in Slovakia
760 mm gauge railways in Slovakia
Heritage railways in Slovakia
Forest railways
Railways with Zig Zags